Marplena designina is a moth in the family Drepanidae and the only species in the genus Marplena. Both species and genus were described by Maureen A. Lane in 1973. It is found in South Africa.

References

Endemic moths of South Africa
Moths described in 1973
Thyatirinae
Monotypic moth genera
Moths of Africa
Drepanidae genera